Joselito Pimentel (born May 27, 1963), known professionally as Lito Pimentel, is a Filipino film and television actor. His uncle is the late game show host Pepe Pimentel.

Early life and career 
Pimentel's career began in the early 1980s when talent manager and entertainment columnist Alfie Lorenzo discovered and added him to Lorenzo's stable of talents, The Liberty Boys.

Pimentel appeared in movies such as Moral (1982) starring Lorna Tolentino, Broken Marriage (1983) starring Vilma Santos, Clarizza (1986) with Sarsi Emmanuelle, Lord, Bakit Ako Pa? (1988) starring Snooky Serna, and Lover's Delight (1990) with Alma Moreno and Joey Marquez.

From being a character actor, Lito transitioned into TV hosting via the GMA Network noontime show "Lunch Date" in 1988. He won over a mass fan base with his comic timing and street-smart approach. In 1991, he left the show for another hosting gig in the Sunday game show Family Kuwarta o Kahon where he got to work with his uncle Pepe Pimentel.

He won the Best Supporting Actor Gawad Urian Award for the movie Kapag Napagod Ang Puso (1988).

Personal life 
Pimentel is married to a businesswoman. In 2004, Pimentel was charged with frustrated parricide after allegedly stabbing his wife.

Filmography

Television/Digital

Movies

Awards and nominations

References

External links

1963 births
Living people
ABS-CBN personalities
Filipino male comedians
Filipino male film actors
GMA Network personalities
Male actors from Metro Manila
Filipino male television actors